Erinoid Ground was a cricket ground in Stroud, Gloucestershire.  The first recorded important match on the ground was in 1880, when Stroud played a United South of England Eleven.

In 1956, Gloucestershire played Nottinghamshire in the ground's first first-class match. Gloucestershire played 14 first-class matches at the ground from 1956 to 1963, the last of which saw them play Glamorgan in the 1963 County Championship.

In 1970 the Bristol and District Cricket Association played Midlands Club Cricket Conference on the ground.  Today, the site of the ground is occupied by the Bath Road Trading Estate. The ground's name came from the adjacent Erinoid plastic factory.

References

External links
Erinoid Ground on CricketArchive
Erinoid Ground on Cricinfo

Defunct cricket grounds in England
Cricket grounds in Gloucestershire
Defunct sports venues in Gloucestershire
Stroud